Fritz Wechselberger (9 September 1938 – 30 December 2015) was an Austrian ice hockey player. He competed in the men's tournament at the 1964 Winter Olympics.

References

External links
 

1938 births
2015 deaths
Ice hockey players at the 1964 Winter Olympics
Olympic ice hockey players of Austria
Sportspeople from Innsbruck